Perris v. Hexamer, 99 U.S. 674 (1879), was a United States Supreme Court case in which the Court held a map-maker has no more an exclusive right to use the form of the characters they employ to express their ideas on a map than they have to use the typeface they use for text. Suitably, one could not use copyright to restrict the use of map symbols.

References

External links
 

1879 in United States case law
United States copyright case law
United States Supreme Court cases
United States Supreme Court cases of the Waite Court